Joli Mai is the ninth studio album by Canadian musician Dan Snaith, and third album under the moniker Daphni. It was self-released through Snaith's label Jiaolong on October 6, 2017, and includes tracks from his FabricLive.93 contribution.

Accolades

Track listing

References

2017 albums
Dan Snaith albums